Karl Gunnar Magnus Roupé (born March 23, 1963, in Stockholm, Sweden) is a retired Swedish professional ice hockey player. He spent most of his playing career in Sweden, but spent parts of two NHL seasons with the Philadelphia Flyers.

External links
 

1963 births
Eisbären Berlin players
Färjestad BK players
Hershey Bears players
Living people
Philadelphia Flyers draft picks
Philadelphia Flyers players
Ice hockey people from Stockholm
Swedish ice hockey left wingers